The river Khumib is an ephemeral river crossing the Kunene Region of north-western Namibia. It occasionally carries surface water during the rainy seasons in November and February/March.

The Khumib has its origin near the settlement of Orupembe in the remote north-west of Kunene. From there the river course passes westwards to the Skeleton Coast and drains into the Namib Desert. It only occasionally discharges into the Atlantic Ocean.

References

Rivers of Namibia
Geography of Kunene Region